Buddy's Pizza is an independent pizza restaurant chain based in Detroit, Michigan. Founded in 1946, the company has an annual revenue of US $30 million. The chain's eleven restaurants have a total of 700 employees. Buddy's has been called one of the five best pizzerias in the United States by the Food Network. They have a bocce ball league that plays every Saturday morning at their original location on Conant Street.

Cuisine
The restaurant serves Detroit-style pizza baked in blue steel pans. In addition to pizza, Buddy's serves sandwiches, soups, pastas, salads, Sanders Hot Fudge Sundaes, and chicken tenders.

History
Buddy’s Rendezvous was opened in 1936 by Gus Guerra on Conant Street in Detroit as a “Blind Pig” (A tavern that wasn’t supposed to be selling alcoholic beverages). It wasn’t until 1946 when Buddy’s Rendezvous created the Detroit Style Pizza that it was a success. Circa 1972 the Jacobs family purchased the three-store restaurant chain (Detroit, Farmington Hills, and Warren). In 2021, the Jacobs family still owns the now 19 store restaurant chain. 

The restaurant opened up locations across Michigan and currently has nineteen restaurants. The additional locations are Ann Arbor, Auburn Hills, Bloomfield Hills, Dearborn, Downtown Detroit, Farmington Hills, Grand Rapids, Grosse Pointe, Lansing, Livonia, Novi, Plymouth, Portage, Royal Oak, Shelby Township, Warren, Detroit Woodhaven.

In 2022, the restaurant chain will open up two more locations, Okemos, Michigan and Clarkston, Michigan.

References

External links
 

Restaurants in Detroit
Regional restaurant chains in the United States
Restaurants established in 1946
1946 establishments in Michigan
Pizza franchises
Pizza chains of the United States